Pacific Blue may refer to:

Pacific Blue (TV series)
Pacific blue, a shade of azure manufactured by the Crayola company
Pacific Blue (dye), a dye used in cell biology
Virgin Australia Airlines (NZ) and Virgin Australia operated under brand Pacific Blue Airlines in New Zealand between 2003 and 2014